Sara Elaine Brownell is an American biology education researcher who is a professor at Arizona State University. Her research looks to make undergraduate science teaching more inclusive. She was elected a Fellow of the American Association for the Advancement of Science in 2022.

Early life and education 
Brownell was an undergraduate student in biology at Cornell University. She moved to The Scripps Research Institute, where she worked toward a Master's degree. She joined Stanford University as a doctoral researcher, studying small heat shock proteins (sHSPs) as anti-inflammatory therapeutics. She found that certain sHSPs were protective in mouse models of multiple sclerosis and stroke. In particular, deficiency of Alpha B crystallin (CRYAB) is associated with worse disease outcome in stroke patients. She simultaneously earned a Master's degree in education at Stanford University. After completing her doctorate, Brownell joined the faculty at Stanford as a lecturer in biology and developed inquiry-based lab courses. She worked in both the San Francisco State University and University of Washington as a postdocotral researcher in science education.

Research and career 
Brownell studies biology education: how biology students learn and how biology educators can develop more effective and inclusive ways to teach. She was appointed an Assistant Professor at Arizona State University in 2014. She was promoted to Associate Professor in 2018 and full Professor in 2021. In 2020, she founded the University's Research for Inclusive STEM Education Center.

Brownell has investigated the origins of the gender gaps in science, with a specific focus on achievement and participation in biology. Her research has shown that male students are more self-confident than their female counterparts in their science classes. These differences in self-perception can impact motivation and participation. She identified that undergraduates who experience a positive lab environment are considerably more likely to complete a degree in STEM. She has investigated how students from marginalized groups experience active learning, and why educators from underrepresented groups may disclose their identities to students. In particular, Brownell showed that active learning forces students to interact with one another, which can make LGBTQ+ students feel like they have to "come out".

Brownell identified that there is a cultural disconnect between secular college educators and often more religious college students. Together with PhD student Elizabeth Barnes, Brownell developed strategies to help educators reduce any conflicts between the teaching of evolution and holding of religious beliefs. Barnes and Brownell showed that it was possible to acknowledge that theological questions being with "why", whilst science attempts to answer "how".

Awards and honors 
 2020 Arizona State University Committee for Campus Inclusion Catalyst Award
 2020 National Organization of Gay and Lesbian Scientists and Technical Professionals LGBTQ+ Educator of the Year 
 2021 National Association of Biology Teachers Evolution Education Award
 2022 John A. Moore Lectureship
 2022 Elected Fellow of the American Association for the Advancement of Science

Selected publications

References 

Living people
Cornell University alumni
Scripps Research alumni
Stanford University alumni
Arizona State University faculty
Fellows of the American Association for the Advancement of Science
Year of birth missing (living people)